Brie Gertler is an American philosopher who works primarily on problems in the philosophy of mind.  A mind-body dualist, she is Commonwealth Professor of Philosophy and Vice-Provost for Academic Affairs at the University of Virginia.  Her special interests include introspection, consciousness and mental content.

She has edited Privileged Access (2003), an anthology of papers on self-knowledge, and co-edited (with Lawrence Shapiro)  "Arguing about the Mind" (2007), a reader in the philosophy of mind.

Education and employment
Gertler has written numerous papers on her research and is a seasoned book reviewer.  She received a BA with High Honors in Philosophy from Swarthmore College in June 1989 and an MA at the University of Pennsylvania three years later.  In June 1997, she was granted a PhD by Brown University.

Gertler first found employment as an assistant professor at The College of William & Mary, where she worked from 1997 to 2001, before moving on to the University of Wisconsin–Madison, where she earned tenure. She moved to her University of Virginia teaching position in 2004, was later department chair, and added the Vice-Provost title in 2021.

"In Defense of Mind-Body Dualism"
To the thirteenth edition of the Joel Feinberg- and Russ Shafer-Landau-edited Reason & Responsibility, Gertler contributed a paper in support of dualism.  It explored the fundamentals of the mind-body problem and defended her philosophy against charges of "spookiness".  Her argument is founded on the claim that, in feeling pain, we know the essence of the mental state of pain.

Awards
 University of Virginia Summer Grant (Summers 2005, 2007).
 Fellow, Institute for Research in the Humanities, University of Wisconsin (Autumn 2004: declined).
 University of Wisconsin Summer Research Funds (Summers 2002, 2003).
 College of William and Mary Summer Grant (Summer 2000).
 NEH Stipend to attend a seminar on folk psychology, led by Robert Gordon University (Summer 1999).
 NEH Summer Grant (Summer 1998).
 Brown University President's Award for Teaching Excellence (Spring 1996).

See also

American philosophy
List of American philosophers
Nat Gertler

References
 Gertler, Brie. "In Defence of Mind-Body Dualism." In Reason & Responsibility: Readings in Some Basic Problems of Philosophy, edited by Joel Feinberg and Russ Shafer-Landau, 285-297. California: Thomson Wadsworth, 2008.

External links
 Gertler's profile at the University of Virginia
 Gertler's home page at the University of Virginia
 

20th-century American philosophers
21st-century American philosophers
Philosophers of mind
Swarthmore College alumni
University of Pennsylvania alumni
Brown University alumni
College of William & Mary faculty
University of Wisconsin–Madison faculty
University of Virginia faculty
Year of birth missing (living people)
Living people
Place of birth missing (living people)